Indonesian Buffalo Youth Movement was the youth wing of PDI, which was formed in May 1991. The movement was formed by Suryadi, the chairman of the Indonesian Democratic Party, as a way develop networks of thugs to intimidate and pressure his opposition.

References

Bibliography 
 

Political organizations based in Indonesia